"The Death of Ilalotha" is a short story by American author Clark Ashton Smith as part of his Zothique cycle, and first published in the September 1937 issue of Weird Tales.

Plot
Amid festivities, Ilalotha who is next in succession to Queen Xantlicha dies of fatal passion. Lord Thulos who is in love with the queen discovers the body. Thulos is suspect since the queen poisoned King Archain and other lovers who do not please the queen. While servants dispatch the body to a necropolis near the palace, the queen and Lord Thulos plan to meet later. However, Thulos is concerned Ilalotha might be a witch. Later that night, Thulos awakes and remembers his appointment but worries he might be late. When he finds he is early, he decides to check the necropolis as he has suspicions Ilalotha might not be dead after all. Something dispatches Lord Thulos. Later, Queen Xantlicha goes to meet Lord Thulos but finds he is absent. Deciding he may have gone to check on Ilalotha, she goes to her tomb. There she finds an undead creature above the body of Lord Thulos. She then flees the tomb.

Reception
In the 1977 book The Weird Tales Story, Robert Weinberg said "Clark Ashton Smith horrified in a grisly tale of love and sadism."

See also 
Clark Ashton Smith bibliography

References

External links

Text of "The Death of Ilalotha"

Short stories by Clark Ashton Smith
Fantasy short stories
1937 short stories
Works originally published in Weird Tales